This page documents Huddersfield Town's 1999–2000 season.

Following the sacking of Peter Jackson at the end of the previous season, owner Barry Rubery hired Steve Bruce as his replacement, and Huddersfield finished in 8th place in Division One that season, just 2 points outside the play-offs. This season also saw Town beat Chelsea at Stamford Bridge in the League Cup.

Squad at the start of the season

Review
Rubery and managing director Ian Ayre talked up the side's chances of promotion, pointing to the acquisition of the high-profile Steve Bruce as a clear indication of their ambition. More serious investment brought the likes of Clyde Wijnhard, Chris Lucketti, Giorgos Donis, Scott Sellars, Kenny Irons, Ken Monkou and Dean Gorré to the club. The Terriers tore up the Division for the first few months playing attractive attacking football in the 7–1 annihilation of Crystal Palace (their best league result for 20 years), plus notable wins over rivals Ipswich Town, recently relegated Premier League side Blackburn Rovers, Manchester City and Nottingham Forest. During October and November, Town won 6 games in a row, a best for 17 years. In early October, the side even scored a famous 1–0 victory over Chelsea at Stamford Bridge in the League Cup and were widely considered to be 'the best Town side in 30 years'. They lost to fellow Premier League side Wimbledon in the next round.

By Christmas time, Town were top of the table, but the loss of key defenders Steve Jenkins, Chris Lucketti, Ken Monkou and David May (who only made one appearance for Town because of injury) all suffered injuries at the wrong time. At the turn of the year, with the side suffering a blip in form, manager Bruce accepted the BBC's offer to cover previous club Manchester United's involvement in the much-derided FIFA Club World Championship in Brazil. With Town's form suffering, his popularity with the club's supporters plummeted. A run of 2 wins in 13 games didn't help things much either. Also during that run star striker Marcus Stewart was surprisingly sold to fellow 1st Division side Ipswich Town for a record fee of £2.75million. Less than a month later, he scored Ipswich's winning goal in a 2-1 win between the sides at Portman Road. Town signed Sheffield United's striker Martin Smith. Following that dreadful run Town went on a run of 6 games unbeaten, which saw Town on the verge of a play-off place with 4 games left.

After losing 3-0 at home to fellow play-off contenders Bolton Wanderers, they beat relegated Port Vale, meaning Town would get a play-off spot by winning their last 2 games at home to Stockport County and away to Fulham at Craven Cottage, but instead they lost them 2-0 and 3-0 respectively. In the end, if they won either of those last 2 games they would have got a play-off place.

Squad at the end of the season

Results

Division One

FA Cup

League Cup

Appearances and goals

Huddersfield Town A.F.C. seasons
Huddersfield Town F.C.